Surprise Surprise Surprise is the first full-length album by Miracle Legion, released in 1987.

Release
The 10 song LP Surprise Surprise Surprise was released under Rough Trade Records in 1987. It was released on vinyl, cassette and in Japan, CD. The cassette and CD contain bonus tracks Will You Wait? and a cover of "Academy Fight Song" by Mission of Burma.

Track listing
All songs written by Mark Mulcahy and Ray Neal, except where noted

Personnel
Joel Potocsky - bass guitar
Mark Mulcahy - vocals
Jeff Wiederschall - drums
Ray Neal - guitar

References

1987 debut albums
Miracle Legion albums
Rough Trade Records albums